Dudu (Assembly constituency) is one of constituencies of Rajasthan Legislative Assembly in the Ajmer (Lok Sabha constituency).

As on 30 August 2018, there are 229,085 voters (52.55% males and 47.45% females) in the constituency.

Dudu Constituency covers all voters from Dudu Tehsil and part of Phagi Tehsil (4 ILRCs - Phagi, Chauru, Mandor and Nimera).

List of MLA's

References

See also 
 Member of the Legislative Assembly (India)

Jaipur district
Assembly constituencies of Rajasthan